The 1935 Alberta general election was held on August 22, 1935, to elect members of the Legislative Assembly of Alberta.  The newly founded Social Credit Party of Alberta won a sweeping victory, unseating the 14-year government of the United Farmers of Alberta. It was one of only five times that Alberta has changed governments.

Premier John E. Brownlee had resigned on July 10, 1934, when he was sued and found liable for the seduction of a young clerk working in the Attorney-General's office.  Although the verdict was immediately set aside by the presiding judge, the scandal seriously damaged the UFA's reputation among socially conservative Albertans. Provincial Treasurer Richard G. Reid succeeded him, but was unable to change the party's fortunes.

Social Credit won 56 of the 63 seats in the legislature, and over 50% of the popular vote, well beyond even the most optimistic Socred projections. Many of those gains came at the expense of the UFA, which lost all of its seats in one of the worst defeats ever suffered by a provincial government in Canada. Reid and Brownlee, for instance, were heavily defeated by Socred challengers, with Reid being pushed into third place.

The UFA's wipeout happened just a month after the Prince Edward Island Tories lost all 18 of their seats at that year's provincial election. A similar wipeout would not happen again until the 1987 New Brunswick general election, when the governing New Brunswick Tories lost all 39 of their seats.

The Alberta Liberals in this election ran with the tactically fatal slogan, the "rest of Canada can't be wrong"—referring to the popularity of the Liberal Party in the rest of the country. It did not work; they had their seat count cut in half. However, due to the UFA being swept from the legislature, the Liberals wound up as the Official Opposition. The Conservatives lost four of their six seats.

The Socreds' expectations for the election had been so low that they had not even named a formal leader for the campaign. When the newly elected Socred MLAs held their first caucus meeting, the first order of business was to select a leader and premier-designate. The obvious choice was the party's founder and guiding force, Calgary-based Baptist pastor William Aberhart. Persuaded to accept the mantle of leadership, Aberhart was sworn in as premier on September 3.

This provincial election, like the previous two, saw district-level proportional representation (Single transferable voting) used to elect the MLAs of Edmonton and Calgary. City-wide districts were used to elect multiple MLAs in the cities. All the other MLAs were elected in single-member districts through Instant-runoff voting. 

The turnout of the 1935 election topped 80%, and no election in Alberta has come close to this mark.

This election campaign is seen as the most negative in Alberta's history, with reports of Social Credit members, operating openly and on Aberhart's directives, defacing the campaign signs of opponents and drowning their speeches by honking car horns. Many campaign ads also focused mostly on attacking the opposing parties.

After the 1935 election results were in, newspapers across North America took notice, with the Boston Herald running the headline "Alberta Goes Crazy!".

This shift marked the first in Social Credit's nine consecutive election victories, for a total of 36 years in office–one of the longest unbroken runs in government in the Commonwealth. The UFA never recovered from this wipeout defeat, and withdrew from politics altogether in 1937.

Results
Overall voter turnout was 81.8%, the highest in Alberta history.

Members elected
For complete electoral history, see individual districts

References

Further reading

 
 

Party platforms

See also
 List of Alberta political parties

1935 elections in Canada
1935
1935 in Alberta
August 1935 events